Tenellia longi is a species of sea slug, an aeolid nudibranch, a marine gastropod mollusc in the family Fionidae.

Distribution
This species was described from Isla Raza, Baja California, Mexico, .

Description 
The adult size of this species is up to 32 mm in length. The cerata are cored with green digestive gland and have surface rings of pale blue, yellow-gold and red pigment and white tips.

References 

Fionidae
Gastropods described in 1985